Walter Richard Whitehurst (born April 11, 1964) is an American former professional baseball right-handed pitcher who played from  to  with the New York Mets, San Diego Padres and New York Yankees of Major League Baseball (MLB). Standing 6'3" and weighing 195 pounds, Whitehurst attended the University of New Orleans where he compiled a 37-15 record.

Playing career
Originally selected by the Oakland Athletics in the third round of the 1985 MLB draft, Whitehurt became a member of the Mets organization when he was part of a three-team trade that took place on December 11, . He was sent by Oakland, with Kevin Tapani, to the Mets. The Los Angeles Dodgers sent Bob Welch and Matt Young to the Athletics, and Jack Savage to the Mets. The Athletics then sent Alfredo Griffin and Jay Howell to the Dodgers, with the Mets sending Jesse Orosco to the Dodgers.

Whitehurst stayed in the minor leagues until July 17, when he made his MLB debut at the age of 25. In one inning of work, he allowed one hit and walked three batters, surrendering two earned runs. His season did improve though, and he finished with a 4.50 earned run average in nine games.

In 65+ innings, he walked only nine batters and posted a 3.29 ERA.

His 7-12 record was the worst among all the pitchers who had started more than 10 games with the Mets that year, as was his 4.19 ERA. He was limited to the bullpen during the last month of the season.

He was traded to the Padres after the season—he was sent with D. J. Dozier and Raul Casanova for Tony Fernández. After the 1994 season, he was released by the Padres and picked up by the San Francisco Giants. In April , the Giants released him and he was signed by the Boston Red Sox. Whitehurst was released by the Red Sox in July, but picked up by the Toronto Blue Jays a short time later. After the 1995 season-a year in which he saw no major league action-he was granted free agency and picked up by the Montreal Expos. In June , Whitehurst was selected off waivers from the Expos by the New York Yankees, and he started two games with them, winning one and losing one. In eight innings of big league work in 1996, he struck out only one batter (José Herrera).

Whitehurst appeared in his final big league game on August 29, . Overall, he went 20-37 with a 4.02 ERA. He walked 130 batters and struck out 312 batters in 487+ innings of work. He batted .150 in 107 career at bats, and his fielding percentage was .948. He wore number 47 while with the Mets, 41 with the Padres and 55 with the Yankees. He spent five seasons with Dwight Gooden and David Cone-longer than any other teammates.

Post-playing career
Since Whitehurst's playing days ended, he has been a pitching coach. He coached the Arizona League Padres in 2004, the Eugene Emeralds in 2005 and 2006, the Fort Wayne Wizards in 2007, and the Lake Elsinore Storm in 2008.

After serving as a substitute teacher at his old high school, Terrebonne High School in Houma, Louisiana, Whitehurst has since become the pitching coach for the Lynchburg Hillcats of the Carolina League. However, in 2010, the Pirates and Cincinnati Reds swapped minor league franchises. As a result, the Reds took control of the Hillcats, while the Pirates received Cincinnati's Sarasota Reds. The Pirates then moved Sarasota's operations to nearby Bradenton, where the club was renamed the Bradenton Marauders. Whitehurst then served as the pitching coach for the Altoona Curve.

Whitehurst has left the ranks of coaching professional baseball and is currently living in Houma and working as a salesman in the oil and gas Industry.

References

External links

1964 births
Living people
American expatriate baseball players in Canada
Baseball players from Shreveport, Louisiana
Columbus Clippers players
Huntsville Stars players
Madison Muskies players
Major League Baseball pitchers
Modesto A's players
New Orleans Privateers baseball players
New York Mets players
New York Yankees players
Ottawa Lynx players
Pawtucket Red Sox players
Phoenix Firebirds players
San Diego Padres players
Syracuse Chiefs players
Terrebonne High School alumni
Tidewater Tides players
Wichita Wranglers players